Ann Mui Oi-fong (梅愛芳) (10 December 1959 – 16 April 2000) was a Hong Kong singer and actress.

Background
Born on 10 December 1959 in China, Mui experienced much hardship in her childhood. Her father died when she was very young and her mother  raised four children alone.

Like her sister Anita, Ann had a dramatic contralto singing voice, which is a rarity in Chinese pop music. Despite not being twins, both Ann and Anita's singing voices were strikingly similar, with the only way to tell them apart was the hand in which they hold the microphone. She is best remembered for her supporting roles in many movies, especially Jackie Chan's Police Story 2.

Ann Mui died of cervical cancer in 2000, as would Anita three years later. Both sisters died at age 40. Ann died in St.Paul Hospital, Causeway Bay, and her ashes were interred in Shang Sin Chun Tong, Kowloon Tong.

Personal life
In 1991, she married the father of her two sons, Poon Lap-Tak, whom she and her family was estranged from until her death in 2000.

Filmography
 1995 – Farewell My Dearest
 1988 – Police Story Part II
 1991 – Touch and Go
 1990 – Stagedoor Johnny
 1990 – Chicken A La Queen
 1989 – Burning Ambition
 1989 – The Iceman Cometh
 1989 – They Came to Rob Hong Kong

References

 IMDB bio for Ann Mui
 Ann Mui funeral coverage

External links

1959 births
2000 deaths
Deaths from cervical cancer
Deaths from cancer in Hong Kong
20th-century Hong Kong women singers
Hong Kong film actresses
Hong Kong Mandopop singers
Hong Kong television actresses
20th-century Hong Kong actresses
Hong Kong contraltos